During the 1996–97 English football season, Portsmouth F.C. competed in the Football League First Division.

Season summary
In the summer of 1996, Terry Venables arrived at Portsmouth as a consultant, later taking over as chairman after buying the club for £1. The team enjoyed a run to the FA Cup quarter-finals, beating Premiership side Leeds United en route, but finished just short of the qualifying places for the play-offs for promotion to the Premier League.

Final league table

Results
Portsmouth's score comes first

Legend

Football League First Division

FA Cup

League Cup

Squad

References

Portsmouth F.C. seasons
Portsmouth